Terence T. Howard (born 13 September 1937) is an English former footballer who represented Great Britain at the 1960 Summer Olympics. Howard worked as a fishmonger at Billingsgate Market.

References

1937 births
Footballers from Greater London
English footballers
Footballers at the 1960 Summer Olympics
Hendon F.C. players
Living people
Olympic footballers of Great Britain
Association footballers not categorized by position